Stormy Weather is a 1957 studio album by Lena Horne, released by RCA Victor in monophonic. Recording took place between March 1956 and March 1957, at Webster Hall, New York.

Track listing
"Tomorrow Mountain" (Duke Ellington, John La Touche) – 2.55
"Out of This World" (Johnny Mercer, Harold Arlen) – 3.37
"Summertime" (George Gershwin, Ira Gershwin, DuBose Heyward) – 2.52
"Mad About the Boy" (Noël Coward) – 3.03
"Ridin' on the Moon" (Mercer, Arlen) – 1.56
"Stormy Weather" (Arlen, Ted Koehler) – 3.45
"Baby Won't You Please Come Home" (Charles Warfield, Clarence Williams) – 2.12
"Any Place I Hang My Hat Is Home" (Arlen, Mercer) – 3.30
"I'll Be Around" (Alec Wilder) – 2.54
"I Wonder What Became of Me" (Arlen, Mercer) – 2.57
"Just One of Those Things" (Cole Porter) – 2.00

CD bonus tracks
The CD re-issue includes several single only tracks recorded during the studio session for the LP Stormy Weather, 
also included are the four tracks originally released in 1957 on the EP Lena Horne at the Cocoanut Grove.

 "Stormy Weather" (Harold Arlen, Ted Koehler) – 3.52 (Alternative previously unreleased recording)
 "Come Runnin'" (Roc Hillman) – 2.53 (Previously unreleased recording from the 1956 recording sessions)
 "From This Moment On" (Cole Porter) – 1.53 (Previously issued in 1956 as a 78rpm single release only)
 "A Cock-Eyed Optimist" (Richard Rodgers, Oscar Hammerstein II) – 3.28 (Previously issued on the 1957, 45rpm EP, "Lena Horne at the Cocoanut Grove" only)
 "I Have Dreamed" (Richard Rodgers, Oscar Hammerstein II) – 2.14 (Previously issued on the 1957, 45rpm EP, "Lena Horne at the Cocoanut Grove" only)
 "The Surrey with the Fringe on Top" (Richard Rodgers, Oscar Hammerstein II) – 3.28 (Previously issued on the 1957, 45rpm EP, "Lena Horne at the Cocoanut Grove" only)
 "Wouldn't It Be Loverly" (Frederick Loewe, Alan Jay Lerner) – 2.51 (Previously issued on the 1957, 45rpm EP, "Lena Horne at the Cocoanut Grove" only)
 "What's Right for You (Is Right for Me)" (Hubert Doris, Tommy Goodman, Bernie Gluckman) – 2.55 (Previously issued in 1956 as a 78rpm single release only)
 "Sweet Thing" (Betty Walberg, Bob Herget) – 2.29 (Previously issued in 1957 as a 78rpm single release only)
 "That Old Feeling" (Lew Brown, Sammy Fain) – 2.16 (Previously issued in 1957 as a 78rpm single release only)

Personnel
Lennie Hayton – Arranger, Conductor
Marty Paich – Conductor Tracks 20 and 21
Lena Horne – vocals
 with Lennie Hayton and His Orchestra
 Gene DiNovi – piano
 George Duvivier – bass
 Kenny Burrell, Howard Roberts – guitar
 Maurice Wilk, Max Chan, Julius Brand, Gene Orloff, Arnold Eidus – violin
 Maurice Brown – cello
 Joe Marshall Jr., John Cresi, Shelly Manne – drums
 Jimmy Maxwell, Charlie Shavers, Harold "Shorty" Baker, Carl "Doc" Severinsen – trumpet
 Jimmy Cleveland, Robert Byrne, Bart Varsolona – trombone
 Danny Bank, Eddie J. Wasserman, Bernard Kaufman, Abraham Richman, Emanual Gershman – saxophone

References

1957 albums
Lena Horne albums
RCA Records albums
Albums conducted by Marty Paich
Albums conducted by Lennie Hayton
Albums arranged by Lennie Hayton